The League of Nations was a multinational villainous professional wrestling stable in WWE. It was active from November 2015 to April 2016 and composed of Sheamus from Ireland, King Barrett from England, Rusev from Bulgaria, and Alberto Del Rio from Mexico. The concept of the group came from the idea that all of its members were immigrants to the U.S. and banded together to represent their respective nations while displaying anti-U.S. sentiments. Formed during a time when WWE was attempting to establish Roman Reigns as the face of the company, critics panned the group for being created by the company solely for the purpose of being defeated by Reigns. Former members of the group have since voiced similar criticisms.

History 

At Survivor Series on November 22, 2015, Sheamus won the WWE World Heavyweight Championship after cashing in his Money in the Bank contract on Roman Reigns. Sheamus then defended the title in a rematch on the November 30 episode of Raw, but the match was interrupted by King Barrett, Rusev, and Alberto Del Rio (then the United States Champion). Sheamus subsequently announced that the four had formed the League of Nations. The group had their first match together later that night, teaming with then-WWE Tag Team Champions The New Day (Big E, Kofi Kingston, and Xavier Woods) to defeat Reigns, Dean Ambrose, and the Usos in a 7-on-4 handicap match. On the December 3 episode of SmackDown, the League of Nations lost to Reigns via count-out in a 4-on-1 handicap match. They were then involved in a 16-man fatal four-way elimination tag team match on the following episode of Raw, facing The Wyatt Family (Bray Wyatt, Braun Strowman, Luke Harper, and Erick Rowan), ECW Originals (Dudley Boyz, Tommy Dreamer, and Rhyno) and the team of Reigns, Ambrose, and The Usos; the match culminated in Reigns pinning Sheamus for the win.

While maintaining a rivalry with Reigns and his allies, League members also had individual storylines; Jack Swagger started a feud with Del Rio over the United States Championship, while Rusev was written into a story with Ryback. Both of these angles culminated at TLC: Tables, Ladders & Chairs, where all members were successful in their separate singles matches, with Del Rio and Sheamus retaining their championships (the latter needing help from his cohorts). However, Sheamus' World Heavyweight Championship run ended the following night on Raw when he lost the title back to Reigns, ending his reign at 22 days. He had a rematch against Reigns on the January 4, 2016 episode of Raw, but failed to regain the title even with Mr. McMahon acting as the special guest referee. On the January 11, 2016 episode of Raw, Del Rio lost the United States Championship to Kalisto, only to regain it the following day on SmackDown after interference by Barrett. At the Royal Rumble, Del Rio once again lost the championship to Kalisto, and all members except Barrett participated in the Royal Rumble match but they assaulted Reigns after he eliminated Rusev and before Roman returned to the match to get revenge on Del Rio and Sheamus.

Del Rio got a United States Championship rematch, which was contested in a two-out-of-three-falls match, on February 21 at Fastlane; he was unsuccessful. Also at Fastlane, the League of Nations entered into a feud with then-Tag Team Champions The New Day, who had since become fan favorites. They mocked the League of Nations in skits by calling them the "League of Booty". Sheamus and Barrett unsuccessfully challenged Big E and Kingston for their title at Roadblock on March 12, and Del Rio and Rusev were defeated by Big E and Woods in another title bout the following night on Raw, prompting all four members to attack The New Day after the match. The League of Nations then challenged The New Day to a match at WrestleMania 32 on April 3, where they won, but were attacked by Mick Foley, Stone Cold Steve Austin, and Shawn Michaels after the match.

On the April 4 episode of Raw, Barrett and Sheamus faced The New Day in another tag team title match, in a losing effort. After the match, the other League of Nations members singled out Barrett as the "weak link" and attacked him before ejecting him from the group. In the chaos, the remaining members were then attacked by the Wyatt Family. This marked Barrett's last appearance for WWE before his release from the company in May. The storyline with the Wyatt Family was cut short later that month after Wyatt suffered a legitimate calf injury. In their final appearance together, the group competed in a six-man tag match against Kalisto, Cesaro, and Sami Zayn on the April 28 episode of SmackDown, but Del Rio and Rusev walked out during the match. Sheamus, who did the same, confronted Del Rio and Rusev during a brawl and subsequently disbanded the League of Nations. Del Rio also confirmed in an interview that the group had disbanded, stating: "We as a group have never worked very well, so we decided that it is better to separate".

Reception 
Critics panned WWE's handling of the League of Nations. Wrestling Observer Newsletter writer Steve Khan wrote on the League's purpose for existence in December 2015, "You can rightfully complain about the League of Nations losing to one guy on their second night as a team, but we all know they don't really matter. They exist to get Roman Reigns over". In March 2016, Pro Wrestling Dot Net writer Haydn Gleed criticized how WWE squandered the four men's combined potential and still never explained in storyline why the League of Nations had formed, noting that they had become "bad guns for hire who never accomplish their task(s)" instead of a "credible threat". Also in that month, Pro Wrestling Torch writer Greg Parks said that for the members of the League, "most of them are less over (and certainly less interesting) than when the group was created".

In a September 2016 interview, Sheamus said, "The whole League of Nations thing wasn't everyone's cup of tea for those of us involved, it didn't do any of us any favours." He also said he felt "stuck in a rut" for the first time in his career while he was part of the group, which he said was "set up to make Roman Reigns a babyface". In an interview shortly after his departure from WWE, Barrett also said that the stable was merely a foil for Reigns. According to sports journalist Dave Meltzer, the faction "wasn't a success" and, along with his pairing with Zeb Colter, saw Del Rio take a less prominent role onscreen as his high-profile feud with John Cena was halted. Upset with his spot in the company, Del Rio requested his release and it was granted in September. The poor reception was also worked into a 2016 in-character interview with Rusev, who said the faction was a "bad idea" and that he was "thrown off" during his time in it. During an out-of-character interview in 2020, he said, "Theoretically, on paper, it could have been the best faction in history, but they never had a chance. They were there to be a punching bag for Roman Reigns, which is okay. We did great, we built him up and he went on to win the title [at WrestleMania] so we did our job right."

Championships and accomplishments 

 WWE
WWE United States Championship (2 times) – Alberto Del Rio
 WWE World Heavyweight Championship (1 time) – Sheamus

References 

WWE teams and stables